Gareth Alun Morris FRS (born 6 July 1954) is a Professor of Physical Chemistry, in the School of Chemistry at the University of Manchester.

Education
Morris was educated at the Royal Grammar School, Newcastle and the University of Oxford where he was a student of Magdalen College, Oxford. He was awarded a Master of Arts degree followed by a Doctor of Philosophy degree in 1978.

Research
Research in the NMR lab along with Mathias Nilsson, Jordi Burés and Ralph Adams involves the development of novel nuclear magnetic resonance spectroscopy techniques, and their application to problems in chemistry, biochemistry, and medicine.

Awards and honours
Morris was elected a Fellow of the Royal Society (FRS) in 2014. His nomination reads: 

Morris received the James Shoolery Award 2015 awarded by SMASH (Small molecule NMR conference):

References

1954 births
Living people
People educated at the Royal Grammar School, Newcastle upon Tyne
Alumni of Magdalen College, Oxford
Fellows of Magdalen College, Oxford
Fellows of the Royal Society